Murad Wilfried Hofmann (1931 – 13 January 2020) was a German diplomat and author. He wrote several books on Islam, including Journey to Makkah and Islam: The Alternative. Many of his books and essays focused on Islam's place in the West and, after 11 September, in particular, in the United States. He was one of the signatories of A Common Word Between Us and You, an open letter by Islamic scholars to Christian leaders, calling for peace and understanding.

Biography
Hofmann was born in Aschaffenburg to an intellectual family related to Hugo Ball, a co-founder of Dadaism. Although raised a Catholic, he converted to Islam in 1980. He studied at Harvard University. His conversion was met with some controversy due to his high profile in the German government. He converted to Islam as a result of what he witnessed in the Algerian War of Independence, his fondness for Islamic art, and what he saw as contradictions in Paulist Christian doctrine.
	 
Hofmann served in the German Foreign Service from 1961 to 1994. He first served in Algeria as a specialist on issues concerning nuclear defence. He went on to serve as Director of Information for NATO at Brussels from 1983 to 1987, Ambassador to Algeria from 1987 to 1990, and Ambassador to Morocco from 1990 to 1994.
	 
Hofmann was an honorary member and advisor to the Central Council of Muslims in Germany.

Commendations
Federal Cross of Merit, Germany.
Commander of the Order of Merit, Italy.
Order of Merit in the Arts and Sciences, 1st Class, Egypt.
Grand Cordon

Publications 

1973 Of Beauty and the Dance: Towards an Aesthetics of Ballet, in: Three Essays in Dance Aesthetic, Dance Perspectives No. 55, New York
1981 Wie MBFR begann, in: Im Dienste Deutschland und des Rechtes, Festschrift für Wilhelm G. Grewe, Nomos, Baden-Baden
1984 Is NATO's Defence Policy facing a Crisis?, in: Non-Nuclear War in Europe, Groningen University Press, Groningen
1981 Ein philosophischer Weg zum Islam
1984 Zur Rolle der islamischen Philosophie
1985 Tagebuch eines deutschen Muslims
1992 Der Islam als Alternative, Diederichs, 
1996 Reise nach Mekka, Diederichs, 
1998 Überarbeitung der Koranübersetzung von Max Henning, Istanbul und München
2000 Der Islam im 3. Jahrtausend, Diederichs-Hugendubel, 
2008 – 'Mustaqbal al-Islam fī al-Gharb wa-al-Sharq' [The Future of Islam in the West and the East], co-authored with cAbd al-Majid al-Sharafī, published by Dar al-Fikr in Damascus, 2008

See also
 List of converts to Islam
 Islam in Europe
 Muhammad Asad

References

External links 
 , an essay by Hofmann
 islamicity.com – Los Angeles Times: U.S. Freedoms Give American Muslims Influence Beyond Their Numbers quotes Hofmann.

People from Aschaffenburg
1931 births
2020 deaths
German Sunni Muslims
German former Christians
Ambassadors of Germany to Algeria
Ambassadors of Germany to Morocco
Converts to Islam from Roman Catholicism
Recipients of the Cross of the Order of Merit of the Federal Republic of Germany
Harvard University alumni
German male writers
Date of birth missing